The Nanjing University of Aeronautics and Astronautics (NUAA), colloquially known as Nanhang (南航), is a public research university in Nanjing, China. One of the Seven Sons of National Defence, it is directly supervised by the Ministry of Industry and Information Technology. The university is part of the Project 211 and a Chinese state Double First Class University Plan university identified by the Ministry of Education of China.

NUAA is a selective university that usually admits top 2% students in the National College Entrance Examination of China. It is ranked among the top 250 universities globally for Mechanical, Aeronautical and Manufacturing Engineering in the QS World University Rankings. It is also among the top 300 institutions of Asia, according to QS World University Rankings and Times Higher Education World University Rankings. According to some rankings in 2021, NUAA ranked within the 301-400 band globally.

History

Founded in October, 1952, as the Nanjing College of Aviation Industry, Nanhang was renamed in 1956 to Nanjing Aeronautical Institute, and in 1993 to its current name. Since 1952, NUAA has evolved from a teaching-oriented university to a research-oriented university that is administrated by the Commission of National Defense Science, Technology and Industry.

Nanhang mainly offers courses in science and engineering, and strives to integrate courses in applied science, management, humanities and social sciences with the themes of aeronautics, civil aviation and astronautics. It is among China's first institutions of higher learning authorized to doctoral, master's, and bachelor's degrees. It is subordinated to the Ministry of Industry and Information Technology of the People's Republic of China. NUAA is included in the Double First Class University Plan designed by the central government of China.

Campus

Nanhang has three campuses: the Ming Palace Campus situated on the ruins of a Ming Palace, and the Jiangjun Road Campus situated in the Jiangning Economic and Technological Development Zone. These campuses cover an area of 173 hectares with a building floor space of 650,000 square meters.

Current
NUAA has attached great importance to scientific research and shown great advantages in the research of basic sciences, the application of high-tech and the development of national defense technology. During the 9th Five-Year-Project, NUAA has taken on 600 projects science and technology development including the "863 Program" and some national defense projects. Many have been successfully applied. Since 1978, NUAA has received 917 provincial awards and 49 national awards for scientific research. It has remained one of the top 10 universities in China since 1991 in terms of the total number of achievements and awards in science and technology research and development.
At the same time, NUAA has always paid great attention to the quality of education and the development of its students. Since 1989, NUAA has won a total of 63 Teaching awards at provincial levels, 18 of which are of national distinction. Students from NUAA have done good jobs in the National competition of Mechanics and Mathematical Modeling for undergraduates. So far NUAA has produced more than 55,000 talents of different specialties.
As one of the most famous universities in Nanjing city, it has attracted more and more international students for its excellent study environment and conditions in recent years, and it also takes great advantages in some key courses, including Flight Vehicle Design and Engineering, Computer Software Design and Internal Economics & Trade and so on. Among all the specialties in the College, Flight Vehicle Design is a national key specialty (see List of unmanned aerial vehicles of China). A special area of strength is Grey System Theory involving Grey Forecasting and Grey Relational Analysis.

NUAA is one of the Seven Sons of National Defence.

Colleges 
NUAA has 18 colleges:
 College of Aerospace Engineering
 College of Energy and Power Engineering
 College of Automation Engineering
 College of Electronic and Information Engineering/College of Integrated Circuits
 College of Mechanical and Electrical Engineering
 College of Material Science and Technology
 College of Civil Aviation
 College of Mathematics/College of Physics
 College of Economics and Management
 College of Humanities and Social Sciences
 College of Advanced Vocational Education
 College of Astronautics 
 College of Arts 
 College of Foreign Languages 
 College of Computer Science and Technology/College of Artificial Intelligence
 Jincheng College 
 Graduate School
 Academy of Frontier Science
 College of International Education

Research centers and laboratories 
Institute for Grey Systems Studies
State Key Laboratory of Mechanics and Control of Mechanical Structures
State Key Laboratory of Helicopter Rotor Dynamics
National Engineering Research Center for Processing of Difficult-to-Machine Materials
State Key Laboratory of Air Traffic Flow Management

Programs 

NUAA offers a wide range of programs including 46 undergraduate programs, 127 master programs and 52 doctoral programs. 2 first grade and 9 second grade disciplines are awarded national key disciplines. The former includes Aerospace Science & Technology and Mechanics. The latter includes Aircraft Design, Aerospace Propulsion Theory & Engineering, Manufacturing Engineering of Aerospace Vehicle, Man-Machine and Environmental Engineering, General and Fundamental Mechanics, Solid Mechanics, Fluid Mechanics, Engineering Mechanics, Mechanical Manufacture & Automation. 8 disciplines are key disciplines of the Commission of National Defense Science, Technology and Industry, such as Tele-Communication & Information Systems, Technology of Micro Air Vehicles, etc. 10 disciplines are key disciplines of Jiangsu Province, such as Mechanical Design and Theory, Navigation Guidance & Control, etc. 4 disciplines such as Aircraft Design, Mechanical Manufacture & Automation, Engineering Mechanics, Manufacturing Engineering of Aerospace Vehicle are especially set up for "Changjiang Scholar Award" professors. Besides, NUAA has set up 12 postdoctoral programs, such as Aerospace Science & Technology, etc.

International students

The university started enrolling international students largely since 2005 after the establishment of the College of International Education. In 2005, the first batch of full-time international undergraduate students were enrolled with major of Aerospace Engineering, coming from neighboring countries like Nepal and Pakistan. Since then over 400 international students have graduated from NUAA with degrees in majors including Aerospace Engineering, International Business, Mechanical Engineering and Software Engineering. Currently there are over 470 undergraduate international students from 40 countries like Bangladesh, Nepal, India, Pakistan, Indonesia, Malaysia, Kenya, Ghana, Sri Lanka, Saudi Arabia, Yemen, Nigeria, etc.

The university has been enrolling post-graduate international students for several years as well. Dozens of Master and Ph.D-level students have since graduated with various majors and specialties. It also provides scholarships to outstanding international students at both undergraduate and post-graduate levels under various government scholarship schemes including the China Government Scholarship and Distinguished International Students Scholarship schemes.

Apart from full-time students, NUAA has been hosting exchange students coming from universities in Australia, Canada, France and Germany. Every year, under the university's exchange and summer programs with international universities, dozens of international students come to NUAA to study at both undergraduate and post-graduate levels.

NUAA's international students have played important role in lifting its research performance and image in the world. In 2018, a paper authored by a Pakistani doctoral student of NUAA Distinguished Professor Liu Sifeng was quoted by Nature Index, and was later indexed in Essential Science Indicators, a database of the world's top 1% highly cited publications.

Achievements

In 2014, NUAA has produced three Unmanned Ornithopters.
In 2016, an aircraft designed by NUAA engineering students won the 33rd Annual American Helicopter Society Student Design Competition.
The university has produced a great many highly cited scientific papers, including work that has been picked up by Nature INDEX.
Since NUAA's establishment, NUAA's faculty, students and research staff have produced more than 40 unmanned aerial vehicles (UAVs, or 'drones') for China (see, List of unmanned aerial vehicles of China).
In 2017, "Kun dragon" (Kun Long) AG600 (AVIC AG600), designed to be the world's largest amphibious aircraft, had its first successful test flight. The AG600 was co-developed by the NUAA Innovation Center and the China Aviation Industry General Aircraft Co., Ltd., including work on the engine cooling systems.

Journals and Publications 

 Transactions of Nanjing University of Aeronautics and Astronautics.
Journal of Nanjing University of Aeronautics and Astronautics.
 Grey Systems: Theory and Applications.
 Journal of Vibration Engineering
 Journal of Date Acquisition and Processing

Notable faculty & alumni
Sifeng Liu, an international expert on Grey System Theory and Grey Relational Analysis.
Jeffrey Yi-Lin Forrest, a professor of mathematics, systems science, economics, and finance at Pennsylvania State System of Higher Education (Slippery Rock campus) (SSHE), guest professor at Nanhang, and founder and president of the International Institute for General Systems Studies (IIGSS).
Hornsen (HS) Tzou, an international expert in smart structures and "Structronic Systems," author of a text on piezoelectric shells, ASME Fellow, and former Thousand Talents Plan Professor at Zhejiang University who has been active in ASME and in organizing international conferences.
Ye Peijian, a renowned Chinese aerospace scientist.

See also
List of unmanned aerial vehicles of China
NUAA Unmanned Ornithopter
NUAA unmanned helicopter

References

External links 
 Website (English)
 Website (Chinese)
 3D map of NUAA
 Nanjing University of Aeronautics and Astronautics (NUAA)

 
Universities and colleges in Nanjing
Educational institutions established in 1952
1952 establishments in China